Chandipur, is a beach in Balasore District, Odisha, India. The beach is located on the shore of Bay of Bengal and is approximately 16 kilometers from the Balasore Railway Station. The beach is unique in a way that the water recedes up to 5 kilometers during the ebb tide. Due to its unique circumstances, the beach supports bio-diversity. Horseshoe crab is also found here on the beach towards Mirzapur, the nearby fishing market and community at the confluence of the Budhabalanga River (Balaramgadi). It is a suitable picnic spot. One of Odisha Tourism's Panthanivas (guest house) is situated here.

Geography
Chandipur beach can be submerged at high tide.

Normal Indian weather
Summer temperatures range 25–40 degrees Celsius, while the Winter range is 17–27 degree Celsius. Tourism season is typically November to March.

Ministry of Defence

Chandipur is also the location of the Indian Strategic Forces Command's Integrated Test Range (ITR) at Abdul Kalam Island, formerly known as Wheeler Island. A number of Indian missiles have been tested and launched from the ITR, including nuclear-capable Prithvi, Agni and Shaurya ballistic missiles, as well as Akash and Barak 8 surface-to-air missiles.

Transport
Chandipur can be reached by travelling up to Baleswar by rail or road and then thereafter catching a bus, auto or taxi. Road access to Baleswar is via National Highway 16 (NH-16). Chandipur sea beach is 16 km from Balasore railway station.

Also avail the local guide & trekker service to see the major locations of Panchalinegeswar, Khirachora Gopinath temple, Chandipur Beach, Emami Jagannath temple, & Nilgiri Jagannath temple.

Food
Many types of seafood are available in hotels and restaurants. Fish is especially inexpensive here.

References

External links
  

Cities and towns in Balasore district
Beaches of Odisha
Balasore